Patrick Bosman (born 16 January 1994 in Haren, Groningen) is a Dutch-born Austrian former professional cyclist, who rode between 2013 and 2019 for the  and .

Major results
2014
 8th Overall Oberösterreichrundfahrt
2015
 8th Overall Tour of China I
2017
 1st Overall Tour of Szeklerland
1st Stage 2

References

External links

1994 births
Living people
Austrian male cyclists
People from Haren, Groningen
Cyclists from Groningen (province)